John Graves Hester (born September 14, 1983) is a former professional baseball catcher. He played in Major League Baseball (MLB) for the Arizona Diamondbacks and the Los Angeles Angels of Anaheim. On August 28, 2009 on his major league debut, he hit a two-run homer in his first Major League at-bat in a game against the Houston Astros.

Education career
He attended Marist School in Atlanta before attending Stanford University.  Hester graduated from Stanford in the spring of 2006.

Major League Career

Arizona Diamondbacks

Hester was selected by the Boston Red Sox in the 34th round of the 2005 MLB Draft but did not sign a professional contract. Later he was selected by the Arizona Diamondbacks in the 13th round (387th overall) of the 2006 MLB Draft.

He was called up to the majors on August 28, 2009 from Triple A Reno Aces after catcher Chris Snyder injured his back and was forced to the disabled list. The same night, Hester hit a two-run homer in first career Major League at-bat in the sixth inning of the game against the Houston Astros off Astros Wilton López after a 2-2 delivery from López.

Baltimore Orioles
Hester was sent to the Baltimore Orioles on April 30, 2011 to complete a previous trade from December 6, 2010 when the ballclub acquired Mark Reynolds.

Los Angeles Angels of Anaheim
On April 24, 2012, the Los Angeles Angels of Anaheim signed Hester and assigned him to the Triple-A Salt Lake Bees, according to MLB.com.

After playing 39 games for the Angels in 2012, Hester returned to Salt Lake in 2013. He elected free agency in October 2014.

Philadelphia Phillies
On October 22 he signed a minor league contract with the Philadelphia Phillies, which includes an invitation to major league spring training. He was released on June 3, 2015.

See also

List of players with a home run in first major league at-bat

References

External links

Stanford Cardinal Baseball bio

1983 births
Living people
Major League Baseball catchers
Arizona Diamondbacks players
Los Angeles Angels players
Stanford Cardinal baseball players
Missoula Osprey players
Visalia Oaks players
Mobile BayBears players
Reno Aces players
Phoenix Desert Dogs players
Gigantes del Cibao players
American expatriate baseball players in the Dominican Republic
Norfolk Tides players
Salt Lake Bees players
Baseball players from Atlanta
Marist School (Georgia) alumni
Mat-Su Miners players
Peninsula Oilers players